Mark Ryan Newman (April 20, 1949September 12, 2020) was an American professional baseball executive. He served as the senior vice president of baseball operations for the New York Yankees of Major League Baseball and spent 26 years in high-level player development and player personnel posts with their organization. He first joined the Yankees in 1989 after 18 years as a college baseball pitching and head coach.

Early career
Newman was born in 1949. After graduating from high school in Wheeling, Illinois, Newman attended Southern Illinois University, where he played college baseball as a pitcher and second baseman for the Southern Illinois Salukis. In 1969, he played collegiate summer baseball with the Orleans Cardinals of the Cape Cod Baseball League.

He began his coaching career as pitching coach at Southern Illinois from 1972 through 1980, then was head baseball coach at Old Dominion University (ODU) from 1981–89. In nine seasons at ODU, Newman's teams compiled a winloss record of 321–167–3, won one league championship, and advanced to four conference finals and two NCAA baseball regionals. He was named Coach of the Year in the Sun Belt Conference and in the Commonwealth of Virginia in 1985 and 1987. 

Newman earned a law degree from Southern Illinois University in 1978. He was inducted into the halls of fame of both Southern Illinois (2000) and Old Dominion (1997) universities.

New York Yankees
After the 1989 college season, Newman was appointed the Yankees' coordinator of minor league instruction, serving in that role through 1996 before his promotion to vice president, player development and scouting. During Newman's first decade with the Yankees, the team's farm system produced the core of its Joe Torre-era dynasty that won four world championships in five seasons: Mariano Rivera, Derek Jeter, Jorge Posada, Bernie Williams, Andy Pettitte, and others. He was promoted in 2000 to senior vice president of baseball operations, based at the Yankees' Tampa facilities. In 2010, Minor League Baseball selected him as the winner of the Sheldon "Chief" Bender Award, which honors individuals for their distinguished service in player development.<ref>[https://www.milb.com/history/awards#bender MiLB.com, Sheldon "Chief" Bender Award winners]</ref>

Newman retired from the Yankees at the conclusion of the 2014 season.; 

Death
In retirement, Newman coached youth baseball and basketball in the Tampa area. He died unexpectedly on September 12, 2020, with the New York Post'' reporting that he died in his sleep.

References

1949 births
2020 deaths
Baseball coaches from Illinois
Major League Baseball executives
Major League Baseball farm directors
Major League Baseball scouting directors
New York Yankees executives
Old Dominion Monarchs baseball coaches
Orleans Firebirds players
Sportspeople from Cook County, Illinois
Southern Illinois Salukis baseball coaches
Southern Illinois Salukis baseball players